The Danmarksturneringen i fodbold (shortened to Herre-DM, or simply DM) is a men's association football league tournament in Denmark, comprising the top four nation-wide professional divisions of the Danish football league system. The national league system was established by the Danish FA in 1927, following the discontinuation of the Landsfodboldturneringen knock-out tournament after 15 editions (1913–1927). The first season, 1927–28 Danmarksmesterskabsturneringen, involved twenty teams — that had qualified through the regional football league championships — divided equally into five groups with the five best teams progressing to a final group phase. Following a second season of this two stage format, a two league format was introduced, where ten and seven teams respectively played an opponent once each in two separate divisions. Continuous evolutions to the league format occurred in the seasons that followed. A third division was introduced in 1936, and a fourth division was implemented in 1959, abolished in 1966 and later reintroduced. Initially formed as an amateur league, professionalism was legalized and restricted to the Danmarksturneringen in 1978. The tournament was organized by the Danish FA until the early 1980s, when the administration of the Danmarksturneringen was handed over to the Divisionsforeningen. The task was returned to the Danish FA in the summer of 1996, until the Divisionsforeningen became the organizing body again in July 2013. The clubs finishing bottom of the Danmarksturneringen's basement division have since the 1966-season been relegated to the Danmarksserien, the highest level of amateur football in the country.

The list includes clubs that are current members of the Danmarksturneringen, those who lost their Danmarksturneringen status upon relegation, and those which lost their status by other means. This includes clubs which have become defunct, merged or created superstructures with one or several neighbouring clubs, or have been relegated to a lower non-league position in the national league pyramid. Where a defunct club has been succeeded by a phoenix club, the new club is listed. If a club now only fields youth teams and no senior men's teams, the club's senior men's department is listed as inactive.

Member clubs

The table shows the first and last seasons in which each club competed in a division part of the Danmarksturneringen including the total number of Herre-DM seasons and a summary of the seasons spent in the top flight division. Some clubs' membership was intermittent between their first and last seasons. The current name of the club's senior men's squad and/or professional branch is listed even though the name might differ from the actual period in which the team took part in the Danmarksturneringen – the footnotes detail relevant changes in the club's history. Their affiliation to a regional football association and current division status is also mentioned, highlighting whether the individual clubs are participating in the current season of the Danmarksturneringen, playing at a lower ranking non-league level, have transformed to become a reserve team, or have become defunct or inactive due to a merger, superstructure at senior level or were dissolved.

As of the 2021–22 season, a total of 198 different teams have competed in the Danmarksturneringen since its inception, including nineteen (professional) superstructures involving multiple clubs, forty-five now defunct or inactive senior men's teams and eleven reserve squads. In the spring of 1992, FC Fredericia became the first superstructure to partake in the Danmarksturneringen. Following the formation of FC Midtjylland in July 1999, the second highest placed founding club, BK Herning Fremad, became the first reserve team to play in the Danmarksturneringen, which was followed up by an additional ten reserve teams between 2005 and 2010, in a period where reserve teams were allowed to play at the third level. Aarhus GF and AB Gladsaxe remain the only clubs to have played in all seasons of the Danmarksturneringen, while three teams, namely BK Herning Fremad (FCM reserves), Humlebæk BK and Virum-Sorgenfri BK have only played a half season each due to the former format of the fourth tier (then known as Kvalifikationsrækken). Svaneke BK were engaged in two league matches in the 1939–40 season, before the Danish FA — after consulting with the club — pulled the first team from the league, resulting in their league records being expunged. Sixty-five different teams have participated in the top flight league, with Aarhus GF being the club with the most seasons (84). Svendborg fB have had the most league seasons in the Danmarksturneringen without ever having played in the top division. Being the largest regional football association, the Jutland FA have had the highest number of member clubs complete in the Danmarksturneringen.

Overview has been updated to include the 2021–22 season. A season is regarded as one year long.

Footnotes

References

 
Denmark alphabetical
Football clubs
Football club
Football